Shlykov is a Russian masculine surname, its feminine counterpart is Shlykova. It may refer to
Tatyana Shlykova (1773–1863), Russian ballerina and opera singer
Vitaly Shlykov (1934–2011), Soviet GRU intelligence officer

Russian-language surnames